East Livermore is an unincorporated village in the town of Livermore Falls, Androscoggin County, Maine, United States. East Livermore has a post office with ZIP code 04228.

References

Villages in Androscoggin County, Maine
Villages in Maine